Richard (Dick) S. Nye in an American sailor. He won the Frostbite Regatta three years in a row in 1957, 1958 and 1959. He has won two Fastnet races, two Transatlantic races and three Bermuda Races (two overall wins, one class win).

References

American male sailors (sport)
Living people
Year of birth missing (living people)